Micratys is a genus of very small sea snails, unassigned in a family in the order Cephalaspidea (bubble snails).

Species
 Micratys ovum Habe, 1952
 Micratys wareni Valdés, 2008

References

 Valdés, Á. (2008). Deep-sea "cephalaspidean" heterobranchs (Gastropoda) from the tropical southwest Pacific. In: Héros, V. et al. (eds) Tropical Deep-Sea Benthos 25. Mémoires du Muséum national d'Histoire naturelle. 196: 587–792.

External links
 

Cephalaspidea